Moschiola, the spotted chevrotains, are a genus of small even-toed ungulates in the family Tragulidae. They are found in forests in India, Sri Lanka and perhaps Nepal, and have pale-spotted or -striped upperparts unlike the other Asian members of the family, the mouse-deer of the genus Tragulus.

In former times, the genus was usually treated as monotypic. Described as Moschus meminna, for most of the time the name Tragulus meminna was used, but changed to Moschiola meminna eventually. In the 21st century, this is increasingly divided into up to three parapatric species:

References

External links

Chevrotains
Taxa named by John Edward Gray
Mammal genera

eo:Tragoledoj